Mission San Pedro y San Pablo del Tubutama is located in Tubutama, Sonora and was first founded in 1691 by Father Eusebio Francisco Kino.

Father Antonio de los Reyes on 6 July 1772 submitted a report on the condition of the missions in the Upper and Lower Pimería Alta.  This was his report on Tubutama as translated by Father Kieran McCarty, OFM:

"The Mission at Tubutama, with one outlying mission station, lies eight leagues to the west and a little to the north of the Mission of Sáric.  To the south lies the uninhabited land of Lower Pimeria and to the north are the Papagos and the other pagan nations up to the Colorado and Gila Rivers, some seventy leagues distance from this Mission.

The village at Tubutama is situated on a broad lowland of good and fertile fields where few Indians cultivate their individual fields and communally plant wheat, Indian corn, beans and other crops.  The house of the  Father Missionary is decent and roomy with an adjoining garden of quinces, pomegranates, peaches, and other trees.  The church is interiorly adorned with two altars, paintings in gilded frames, and a small side chapel.  In the sacristy are three chalices, a pyx, a ceremonial cross, ceremonial candle-holders, censer, three dishes and cruets, all of silver, vestments of every kind and color and other interesting adornments for the altar and divine services.  According to the Census Book, which I have here before me, there are forty-five married couples, twelve widowers, six widows, eighteen orphans, the number of souls in all one hundred seventy-six."

The arched entrance reflects the Mudéjar style of Islamic architecture; however, the interior transept is dedicated to the Passion of Christ, and the altarpiece has sculptured instruments of the Passion: crown of thorns, scourge, nails, tongs, ladder, and lances. A sculptured serpent crawls beneath an upper niche in the same altarpiece. This recess now holds a carved statue replicating Sanctuary of Arantzazu, an image of the Blessed Virgin Mary at Arantzazu in the Basque Country (autonomous community) of northern Spain.

See also
 List of Jesuit sites
 Spanish Missions in the Sonoran Desert

References

External links
 San Pedro y San Pablo del Tubutama

1691 establishments in the Spanish Empire
Missions in Sonora
Buildings and structures in Sonora
Churches completed in 1691